Edward N. Martin is the president and CEO of HJ Martin and Son, a Green Bay, Wisconsin-based interior and specialty contractor.  Edward joined the company in 1978, and became the third-generation of the family involved in the business.

Martin has served on numerous charitable and business boards. He was active on the Green Bay Packers’ board from 2004 until 2013, and served on the team’s executive committee from 2006 through 2013. He currently is a member of the board of the Green Bay Packers Hall of Fame. In 2014, Martin was appointed to the Trump International-Chicago board of directors. He serves on the Friends of St. Vincent Leadership Council, a community leadership board for Green Bay’s oldest and largest hospital.

The Edward & Terri Martin Family Atrium, underwritten with financial support from HJ Martin and Son, was constructed in 2017 as part of the new Bellin Health Titletown Sports Medicine & Orthopedic Clinic, which is located in the Green Bay Packers Titletown District. The 3,000 sq. ft. atrium of the clinic faces Lambeau Field and was constructed in part by employees of four divisions of H.J. Martin and Son: Walls & Ceilings, Glass & Glazing, Doors & Hardware and Commercial Flooring.

Martin was actively involved in the creation of the P.H. Martin Webster Sports Complex in Allouez, Wisconsin, a suburb of Green Bay.  Martin and his wife also sponsored the bronze statue of Green Bay Packer Paul Hornung in the Green Bay Packers Heritage Trail Plaza. In 2014, Martin and his wife received the Notre Dame Academy Founders Award for their work with Catholic education and other religious outreach initiatives.

Martin was a co-owner of the horse Titletown Five, with former Green Bay Packers Paul Hornung and Willie Davis and Martin’s sister, Margaret Shade. Titletown Five ran in the 2013 Preakness Stakes.

Martin graduated from the University of Wisconsin–Madison in 1978 with a Bachelor of Science degree. He received the Lifetime Achievement award from the University of Wisconsin–Madison in 2009.

Personal
Martin is a Green Bay, Wisconsin native and is married to his wife, Terri. They have four children: David, Daniel, Joe and Emily. David Martin has been a fourth-generation executive member of H.J. Martin and Son since 2009. Joe Martin joined the company in 2015.

References

External links
, H.J. Martin & Son Leadership Profiles

American chief executives
Businesspeople from Wisconsin
University of Wisconsin–Madison alumni
Living people
People from Green Bay, Wisconsin
Year of birth missing (living people)